Madison High School is a public high school located in Marshall, North Carolina.

History

Opened in the Fall of 1974, Madison High School was a consolidation of four high-schools located in the surrounding areas of Hot Springs, Laurel, Mars Hill, Marshall, and Spring Creek.

On Tuesday, January 25th, 2022, the Principal of Madison High School, Dr. David Robinson, suddenly died of a heart attack.

Facilities

Madison High School has several facilities, including:
 44 Classrooms
 5 Workshops
 1 Greenhouse
 A Shooting Range for the JROTC Program
 6 Science Labs
 A 1-Mile Public Walking Trail

Location

Madison High School and Madison County Schools' Central Office are located on 54 acres of land owned by the Madison County Board of Education. Aside from the main building, the campus includes: an Alternative Learning Program facility, an external Masonry classroom and shop, a Softball Field, and O.E. Roberts Stadium featuring artificial turf, an Olympic-size track, and a field house. Along with these buildings, another school, Madison Early College High School (MECHS) was built in 2018. Prior to the construction of the new campus in 1974, the High School was located in a building just outside of Mars Hill Elementary in Mars Hill.

Population

Madison High has decreased in size since it opened in 1974 from over 800 students to under 600 students.

Transportation

Sixteen buses serve Madison High School and Madison Middle School. The average ride time for students comes out at around an hour and a half, and the average bus route is 23 miles one way. Buses cover an average of 4,500 mi2 a day in Madison County.

Notable alumni
 Nick McDevitt, college basketball head coach

References

External links

Public high schools in North Carolina
Education in Madison County, North Carolina